Edwin Smiley Kneedler (born January 4, 1946) is an American lawyer who has served as Deputy United States Solicitor General since 1993. As of June 2020, he has argued more cases before the Supreme Court of the United States than any other active advocate.

Early life and education 

Kneedler attended North Penn High School; he graduated in 1963. Kneedler earned a B.A. degree in economics in 1967 from Lehigh University. After graduating, he served as a VISTA volunteer in Oregon. He then earned a J.D. degree from the University of Virginia School of Law in 1974.  From 1974 until 1975, he clerked for Judge James R. Browning on the United States Court of Appeals for the Ninth Circuit.

Kneedler was admitted to the bar of the state of Oregon in 1975.

Professional career 

In October 1975, Kneedler joined the Office of Legal Counsel in the United States Department of Justice.  He then joined the office of the Solicitor General in June 1979.  He was appointed a Deputy Solicitor General in 1993. On March 17, 2008, he argued his 100th case before the Supreme Court. On April 27, 2022, he argued his 150th case before the Supreme Court. 

Kneedler became acting solicitor general on January 20, 2009, with the expiration of the presidential term of George W. Bush.  Kneedler was appointed by Bush on January 16, 2009, to replace Gregory G. Garre, whose term as Solicitor General concluded on January 16, 2009.  Kneedler's tenure as Acting United States Solicitor General ended on March 19, 2009, with the confirmation of Elena Kagan.

References

External links

1946 births
Living people
Lehigh University alumni
University of Virginia School of Law alumni
United States Solicitors General
Lawyers who have represented the United States government